The Sabre 38 is an American sailboat that was designed by Roger Hewson and the Sabre Design Team as a racer-cruiser and first built in 1981.

Production
The design was built by Sabre Yachts in the United States, but it is now out of production. A total of 100 of the original design were completed between 1981 and 1987, while 114 of the Mark II version were built from 1988 to 1995.

Design
The Sabre 38 is a recreational keelboat, built predominantly of fiberglass, with wood trim. It has a masthead sloop rig, a raked stem, a reverse transom and a skeg-mounted rudder controlled by a wheel.

The Mark I has sleeping accommodation for six people, with a forward "V"-berth in the bow cabin, a double port side settee berth in the main cabin, along with a single settee berth on the starboard side and double and single aft quarter berths. There is a provided navigation station on the starboard side. The galley is at the foot of the companionway steps on the port side and includes a three-burner alcohol-fired stove and oven, an ice box or refrigerator under the cockpit and a pressurized water supply. The head is located just aft of the bow cabin, on the port side and includes a shower.

Ventilation is provided by hatches over the main cabin and the bow cabin, plus eight opening ports.

The cockpit is "T"-shaped and has self-tailing winches for the genoa. There are winches for the halyards and for reefing. The mainsail has a mainsheet traveler on the cabin top. The boat may be optionally equipped with a boom vang and a spinnaker, including associated hardware and winches.

Variants
Sabre 38
This model was designed by Roger Hewson and the Sabre Design Team and introduced in 1981, with 100 built before production ended in 1987. The centerboard-equipped version displaces , carries  of ballast. The boat has a manufacturer-determined PHRF racing average handicap of 111.
Sabre 38 Mark II
This model was designed by Roger Hewson and introduced in 1988, with 114 completed before production ended in 1995. A shoal draft wing keel and a stub keel with a centerboard were factory options.

Operational history
In a 1994 review Richard Sherwood wrote of the Mark I, "the hull and rig are designed for speed, while the cabin arrangement is comfortable for cruising. Fuel and water are adequate for offshore sailing. The keel model is standard, the keel/centerboard is optional."

See also
List of sailing boat types

Related development
Sabre 28

Similar sailboats
Alajuela 38
C&C 38
Catalina 38
Columbia 38
Eagle 38
Farr 38
Hunter 380
Hunter 386
Landfall 38
Shannon 38
Yankee 38

References

Keelboats
1980s sailboat type designs
Sailing yachts
Sailboat type designs by Roger Hewson
Sailboat type designs by Sabre Design Team
Sailboat types built by Sabre Yachts